The following is a list of mayors of the city of Maceió, in Alagoas state, Brazil.

 Ricardo Brennand Monteiro, 1890	
 Napoleão Goulart, 1890	
 Manoel Eugênio do Prado, 1890-1891	
 Antônio Pereira Caldas, 1891	
 Joaquim José de Araújo Lima Rocha, 1891-1892, 1894-1897
 Bonifácio Magalhães da Silveira, 1892	
 Antônio Francisco Leite Pindaíba, 1892-1894		
 Clarêncio da Silva Jucá, 1897-1899	
 , 1899-1901	
 José de Barros Wanderley de Mendonça, 1901-1903	
 , 1903-1904	
 José Rodi Braga, 1904	
 Cândido de Almeida Botelho, 1904-1905	
 Manoel Sampaio Marques, 1905-1907	
 Antonio Guedes Nogueira, 1907-1909	
 Demócrito Brandão Gracindo, 1909-1911	
 Luís de Mascarenhas, 1911	
 Roberto Otaviano de Sousa Machado, 1911-1913	
 Firmino de Aquino Vasconcelos, 1913-1915	
 Ignácio Uchôa d’Albuquerque Sarmento, 1915-1917	
 Firmino de Aquino Vasconcelos, 1917-1920, 1921-1924
 Leôncio Correa de Oliveira, 1920-1921		
 Ernani Teixeira Basto, 1924	
 Crisanto de Carvalho, 1924-1925	
 José Moreira da Silva Lima, 1925-1927	
 , 1927-1928	
 Ernandi Teixeira Bastos, 1928	
 José Carneiro de Albuquerque, 1928-1930	
 António Baltazar de Mendonça, 1930-1933	
 Orlando Valeriano de Araújo, 1933	
 Alfredo Elias da Rosa Oiticica, 1933-1934	
 Edgar de Góes Monteiro, 1934-1935	
 , 1935	
 Cipriano Jucá, 1935	
 Afonso da Rocha Lira, 1935-1937	
 Eustáquio Gomes de Melo, 1937-1941	
 Francisco Abdon Arroxelas, 1941-1945	
 Antônio Maria Mafra, 1945	
 Reinaldo Carlos de Carvalho Gama, 1945-1948	
 João Teixeira de Vasconcelos, 1948-1950	
 Luiz Campos Teixeira, 1950-1951	
 Joaquim de Barros Leão, 1951-1952	
 Abelardo Pontes Lima, 1952-1953, 1955-1960
 José Lucena de Albuquerque Maranhão, 1953-1955	
 Cleto Marques Luz, 1955		
 Manoel Valente de Lima, 1960-1961	
 Sandoval Ferreira Caju, 1961-1964	
 Vinícius Cansanção Filho, 1964-1966	
 Divaldo Suruagy, 1966-1970	
 Henrique Equelman, 1970-1971	
 Juvêncio Calheiros Lessa, 1971	
 João Rodrigues Sampaio Filho, 1971-1975, 1990-1992
 Dílton Falcão Simões, 1975-1979	
 Fernando Collor, 1979-1982	
 Corintho Onélio Campelo da Paz, 1982-1983	
 José Bandeira de Medeiros, 1983-1985	
 , 1986-1988	
 , 1989-1990	
 , 1992	
 , 1993-1996	
 , 1997-2004	
 , 2005-2012	
 , 2013-2020
 João Henrique Caldas, 2021-

See also
 Maceió history (in Portuguese)
 Alagoas history (state)
 History of Alagoas (state)
 List of mayors of largest cities in Brazil (in Portuguese)
 List of mayors of capitals of Brazil (in Portuguese)

References

This article incorporates information from the Portuguese Wikipedia.

maceio